"Motownphilly" is a song by American vocal harmony group Boyz II Men, released as their first single from their debut album, Cooleyhighharmony. The single was a success, peaking at number three on the Billboard Hot 100. Michael Bivins, who co-wrote the song, provides a guest rap during the bridge. The song title etymology involves a combination of two of the group's main musical influences: 1960s Motown and 1970s Philly soul.

The accompanying music video for the song was filmed in various locations in Philadelphia, the group's home city in December 1990. Two new jack swing groups, Another Bad Creation and Bell Biv DeVoe (of which Bivins was a member), are mentioned in the first verse: "Boyz II Men, ABC, BBD, the East Coast Family." Both groups appear briefly in the video, as does Sudden Impact, a short-lived R&B group organized by Bivins.

Track listings

 US vinyl, 12-inch
A1: "Motownphilly" [12-inch version] 4:47
A2: "Motownphilly" [LP version] 3:52
B: "Motownphilly" [instrumental] 5:50

 US CD maxi
 "Motownphilly" [12-inch version Edit] 4:47
 "Motownphilly" [LP version] 3:52
 "Motownphilly" [quiet storm] 4:06
 "Motownphilly" [12-inch A] 5:50
 "Motownphilly" [12-inch dub] 4:08

 UK vinyl, 7-inch
A: "Motownphilly" [7-inch radio version] 3:50
B: "Motownphilly" [Philly instrumental] 3:50

 UK vinyl, 12-inch
A: "Motownphilly" [12-inch extended club mix] 5:35
B1: "Motownphilly" [7-inch radio version] 3:50
B2: "Motownphilly" [Philly instrumental] 3:50
B3: "Motownphilly" [dub mix] 4:08

 Germany CD maxi
 "Motownphilly" [12-inch version] 5:50
 "Motownphilly" [7-inch main] 3:20
 "Motownphilly" [12-inch dub] 4:09
 "Motownphilly" [quiet storm] 4:06

Charts

Weekly charts

Year-end charts

Certifications

Release history

In popular culture
The song was featured during the 2016 Democratic National Convention, as the convention took place in Philadelphia, the city that the song is named for. The song has also been featured in several films and television series including House Party 2, Full House (in the 1991 episode "Gotta Dance"), Kids Incorporated (covered by the titular group in the 1992 episode "The Commercial"), Hangin' with Mr. Cooper (in both the 1992 pilot episode and the 1995 episode "Talent Show"), and It's Always Sunny in Philadelphia (covered in the 2013 episode "The Gang Gets Quarantined", in which the main characters repeatedly rehearse an a cappella version of the song in order to try to win a spot opening for Boyz II Men in concert while an flu epidemic is sweeping Philadelphia).

References

1990 songs
1991 debut singles
Boyz II Men songs
Culture of Philadelphia
Motown singles
New jack swing songs
Song recordings produced by Dallas Austin
Songs written by Dallas Austin
Songs written by Michael Bivins
Songs written by Nathan Morris
Songs written by Shawn Stockman